Hog Island is a small island and nature reserve, with an area of , part of the Sloping Island Group, lying in the Frederick Henry Bay, close to the south-eastern coast of Tasmania, Australia. The island is situated around the Tasman and Forestier Peninsulas.

Recorded breeding seabird and wader species are Pacific gull, kelp gull, sooty oystercatcher and Caspian tern.

See also

 List of islands of Tasmania

References

Sloping Island Group
Protected areas of Tasmania